Sorin Teodor Popa (24 March 1953) is a Romanian American mathematician working on operator algebras. He is a professor at the University of California, Los Angeles.

Biography
Popa earned his PhD from the University of Bucharest in 1983 under the supervision of Dan-Virgil Voiculescu, with thesis Studiul unor clase de subalgebre ale -algebrelor. He has advised 15 doctoral students at UCLA, including Adrian Ioana.

Honors and awards
In 1990, Popa was an invited speaker at the International Congress of Mathematicians (ICM) in Kyoto, where he gave a talk on "Subfactors and Classifications in von Neumann algebras". He was a Guggenheim Fellow in 1995. In 2006, he gave a plenary lecture at the ICM in Madrid on "Deformation and Rigidity for group actions and Von Neumann Algebras". In 2009, he was awarded the Ostrowski Prize, and in 2010 the E. H. Moore Prize. He is one of the inaugural fellows of the American Mathematical Society. In 2013, he was elected to the American Academy of Arts and Sciences.

Selected publications

References

External links 
 Homepage of Sorin Popa at the University of California, Los Angeles
 UCLA – Sorin Popa elected into the American Academy of Arts and Sciences

1953 births
Living people
Scientists from Bucharest
University of Bucharest alumni
University of California, Los Angeles faculty
Romanian emigrants to the United States
20th-century Romanian mathematicians
21st-century Romanian mathematicians
20th-century American mathematicians
21st-century American mathematicians
Algebraists
Fellows of the American Mathematical Society
Fellows of the American Academy of Arts and Sciences